Québec/Lac Saint-Augustin Water Airport  is located  southwest of Quebec City, Quebec, Canada.

See also
 Québec City Jean Lesage International Airport
 Aérodrome Saint-Louis

References

Certified airports in Chaudière-Appalaches
Seaplane bases in Quebec